Richard D. Arnold (born February 9, 1945) is an Iowa State Representative from the 72nd District. He was first elected to the Iowa House of Representatives in 1994.

Early life and education
Arnold was raised in Russell, Iowa. He obtained his degree in Animal Science from Iowa State University.

Career

Politics
Arnold has served on several committees in the Iowa House - the Local Government committee; the Natural Resources committee; and the Transportation committee.  His prior political experience includes serving on the Lucas County Board of Supervisors from 1987 to 1994 and also on the Russell City Council.

Arnold was re-elected in 2006 with 6,117 votes (60%), defeating Democratic opponent Buzz Malone.

Farming
He is also a farmer and co-owner of Arnold Farm and Trucking.

Organizations
He is an active member of the following organizations:
National Wild Turkey Federation
Pheasants Forever
Iowa Cattleman’s Association

Family
Arnold is married to his wife Cheryl and together they have five children and eight grandchildren.

References

External links
 Representative Rich Arnold official Iowa General Assembly site
 
Profile at Iowa House Republicans

Republican Party members of the Iowa House of Representatives
Living people
1945 births
People from Lucas County, Iowa
County supervisors in Iowa